The Persian wonder gecko (Teratoscincus keyserlingii), also known commonly as the giant frog-eyed gecko, is a species of lizard in the family Sphaerodactylidae. The species is endemic to parts of Asia.

Etymology
The specific name, keyserlingii, is in honor of Alexander von Keyserling, who was a Baltic German geologist and biologist.

Geographic range
T. keyserlingii is found in Afghanistan, Iran, Pakistan, and the United Arab Emirates.

Description

References

Further reading
Macey, J. Robert; Fong, Jonathan J.; Keuhl, Jennifer V.; Shafiei, Soheila; Ananjeva, Natalia B.; Papenfuss, Theodore J.; Boore, Jeffrey L. (2005). "The complete mitochondrial genome of a gecko and the phylogenetic position of the Middle Eastern Teratoscincus keyserlingii ". Molecular Phylogenetics and Evolution 36: 188–193.
Strauch A (1863). "Characteristik zweier neuen Eidechsen aus Persien ". Bulletin de l'Académie Impériale des Sciences de St-Pétersbourg 6: 477–480. (Teratoscincus keyserlingii, new species, p. 480). (in German and Latin).

Teratoscincus
Reptiles of Afghanistan
Reptiles of the Arabian Peninsula
Reptiles of Iran
Reptiles of Pakistan
Reptiles described in 1863
Taxa named by Alexander Strauch